WCSM-FM is an American FM radio station broadcasting at 96.7 MHz in Celina, Ohio. The station features a full-service hot adult contemporary format with local news, weather, sports and agricultural programming. It is co-owned with 1350 WCSM and the two stations simulcast with local news and farm programming, although WCSM's music format is Country music. WCSM-FM music programming comes from Westwood One's mainstream Adult Contemporary service evenings, overnights and weekends.

WCSM-FM's primary coverage area includes Celina and the surrounding towns including St. Marys, Spencerville, Mendon, Rockford, Coldwater, and New Bremen.

WCSM-FM is a charter affiliate of the Agri Broadcast Network and features ABN and Buckeye Ag Radio Network farm news and weather updates throughout the day on weekdays. Both stations also feature high school sports heavily, though the AM and FM stations have different sports schedules.

Its studios and offices remain located at the intersection of Meyer and Schunck Road while its FM transmitter is now located at the Dibble Road tower which is also the location of WPTD's translator W17AA near Wright State's West Ohio Branch Campus at Grand Lake St. Marys.

On June 1, 2022, WCSM-FM changed the adult contemporary portion of its format to hot adult contemporary, branded as "96.7 The Wave".

References

External links
WCSM Radio official website

CSM-FM
Hot adult contemporary radio stations in the United States
Mercer County, Ohio
Auglaize County, Ohio